Alexandr Braico (born 5 March 1988) is a Moldovan former professional racing cyclist, who rode professionally between 2008 and 2016 for the Olimpic Team Autoconstruct,  and  teams.

He rode in the men's team time trial at the 2015 UCI Road World Championships.

Major results

2007
 3rd Road race, National Road Championships
2009
 2nd Road race, National Road Championships
2010
 2nd Road race, National Road Championships
2012
 3rd Road race, National Road Championships
2013
 2nd Time trial, National Road Championships
 6th Overall Tour of Szeklerland
 9th Overall Tour of Romania
2014
 2nd Road race, National Road Championships
 5th Overall Tour of Szeklerland

References

External links

1988 births
Living people
Moldovan male cyclists
People from Ungheni